This is a list of places on the Victorian Heritage Register in the City of Knox in Victoria, Australia. The Victorian Heritage Register is maintained by the Heritage Council of Victoria.

The Victorian Heritage Register, as of 2021, lists the following two state-registered places within the City of Knox:

References

Knox
+